Vinayak Joshi is an Indian film, television, web-series and theatre actor. He has been a host in more than 1000 live events across 20 countries. Currently he is the Head of production at Cult.fit and an independent film maker. He recently acted, directed, produced and wrote a web-series called Joshelay. It has collectively made a million views on YouTube.

Life

He was born on 25 August 1987, Bangalore.
He was a child actor in the 1996 movie Nammoora Mandara Hoove, by Sunil Kumar Desai, starring Shivrajkumar, Ramesh and Prema. 

His other movies include Amrutha Varshini, Laali, Simhada Mari, Kurigalu Saar Kurigalu, Appu, Kanti, Nanna Kanasina Hoove, Minchina Ota, Chitra, Govinadaaya Namaha, Jaguar etc.

Filmography

Actor

Nammoora Mandara Hoove (1997)
Amrutha Varshini (1997)
Simhada Mari (1997)
Laali (1998)
Aryabhata (1999)
Kurigalu Saar Kurigalu (2001)
Chitra (2001)
Appu (2002)
Kanti (2003)
Panchali (2003)
Kiccha (2003)
Baa Baaro Rasika (2004)
Sakha Sakhi (2005)
Nanna Kanasina Hoove (2006)
Minchina Ota
Meravanige (2008)
Govindaya Namaha (2012)
Nam Duniya Nam Style (2013)
Ambara (2013)
Namo Bhoothathma (2014)
Ninnindale (2014)
Jaguar (2016)
Raju Kannada Medium (2018)
Fortuner(2018)
Loose Connection (2018)
Padde Huli (2019)
Adyaksha in America (2019)
9 Sullu (2021)
Viraataparva (2019)

Director
 Joshelay (2018) - Web Series
Dubbing artist
Tejas (Priyanka)
Thakur Anoop Singh (Rogue)
Vishwa Karna (100)

References

External links
 

1987 births
Living people
Indian male child actors
Male actors in Kannada cinema
Indian male film actors
Indian radio presenters
Participants in Indian reality television series
Male actors from Bangalore
21st-century Indian male actors
Indian male long-distance runners
Athletes from Bangalore
Bigg Boss Kannada contestants